Diving competitions at the 2018 South American Games in Cochabamba, Bolivia were held between June 5 and 8, 2018 at the Parque Aquático Mariscal Santa Cruz

Medal summary

Medal table

Medalists

Men

Women

References

Diving
South American Games
2018
Qualification tournaments for the 2019 Pan American Games